Brzozowo-Kolonia  is a settlement in the administrative district of Gmina Dąbrowa Białostocka, within Sokółka County, Podlaskie Voivodeship, in north-eastern Poland.

References

Brzozowo-Kolonia